Bulguk-dong is an administrative dong or a neighbourhood in the administrative subdivisions of the Gyeongju City, North Gyeongsang province, South Korea. It consists of seven legal dong including Gujeong-dong, Sirae-dong, Si-dong, Joyang-dong, Jinhyeon-dong, Ma-dong and Ha-dong.

It is bordered by Toham mountain on the east, Dodong-dong on the west, Oedong-eup on the south and Bodeok-dong on the north. Its 37.34 square kilometers are home to about 8,893 people. Bulguksa temple and Seokguram grotto are situated in the district.

See also
Subdivisions of Gyeongju
Administrative divisions of South Korea

References

External links
 The official site of the Bulguk-dong office

Subdivisions of Gyeongju
Neighbourhoods in South Korea